Dimeromyces is a genus of fungi in the family Laboulbeniaceae. The genus contain 109 species.

References

External links
Dimeromyces at Index Fungorum

Laboulbeniaceae
Laboulbeniales genera